Twelvemile is an unincorporated community in Madison County, in the U.S. state of Missouri.

History
A post office called Twelve Mile was established in 1876, and remained in operation until 1910. The community took its name from nearby Twelvemile Creek.

References

Unincorporated communities in Madison County, Missouri
Unincorporated communities in Missouri